French philosophy, here taken to mean philosophy in the French language, has been extremely diverse and has influenced Western philosophy as a whole for centuries, from the medieval scholasticism of Peter Abelard, through the founding of modern philosophy by René Descartes, to 20th century philosophy of science, existentialism, phenomenology, structuralism, and postmodernism.

Medieval period

Peter Abelard

Peter Abelard (1079 – April 21, 1142) was a scholastic philosopher, theologian and logician. The story of his affair with and love for Héloïse has become legendary. The Chambers Biographical Dictionary describes him as "the keenest thinker and boldest theologian of the 12th Century".

The general importance of Abelard lies in his having fixed more decisively than anyone before him the scholastic manner of philosophizing, with the object of giving a formally rational expression to received ecclesiastical doctrine. However his own particular interpretations may have been condemned, they were conceived in essentially the same spirit as the general scheme of thought afterwards elaborated in the 13th century with approval from the heads of the Church.

He helped to establish the ascendancy of the philosophical authority of Aristotle which became firmly established in the half-century after his death. It was at this time that the completed Organon, and gradually all the other works of the Greek thinker, first came to be available in the schools. Before his time Plato's authority was the basis for the prevailing Realism. As regards his so-called Conceptualism and his attitude to the question of Universals, see Scholasticism.

Outside of his dialectic, it was in ethics that Abelard showed greatest activity of philosophical thought. He laid particular stress upon the subjective intention as determining, if not the moral character, at least the moral value, of human action. His thought in this direction, anticipating something of modern speculation, is the more remarkable because his scholastic successors accomplished least in the field of morals, hardly venturing to bring the principles and rules of conduct under pure philosophical discussion, even after the great ethical inquiries of Aristotle became fully known to them.

Pope Innocent III accepted Abelard's Doctrine of Limbo, which amended Augustine of Hippo's Doctrine of Original Sin. The Vatican accepted the view that unbaptized babies did not, as at first believed, go straight to Hell but to a special area of limbo, "limbus infantium". They would therefore feel no pain but no supernatural happiness either (only natural) because, it was held, they would not be able to see the deity that created them.

16th century 

Michel Eyquem de Montaigne (1533–1592) may have been Catholic, but his anti-dogmatic stances made him the father of the anti-conformist French spirit. His work consists of little trials for his thoughts, filled with autobiographical and casual anecdotes. His intention with his essays was to leave something by which family could remember him. He was the first person to use the word essays, and his writings came to be highly influential upon Shakespeare, Rousseau and Nietzsche. His Pyrrhonian philosophical skepticism, summed up in his personal motto of Que sais-je? ("what do I know?"), served as one of the catalysts for René Descartes' oeuvre.

17th century 

Modern philosophy began in France with the philosophy of René Descartes (1596–1650). His Meditations on First Philosophy changed the primary object of philosophical thought from ontology to epistemology and overcame the Aristotelian dogmatism inherited in philosophy from Scholasticism, the dominant form of thought in preceding centuries, while simultaneously raising some of the most fundamental problems for future generations of philosophers.

René Descartes 

René Descartes was concerned with the uncertainty in the sciences and the radical scepticism which spread across Europe when publications of Sextus Empiricus became available. Descartes desired to find indubitable ground on which all the sciences could be placed and progressively built. Thus he rejected anything which appeared uncertain and decided to only accept apodeictic knowledge as truth.

After invoking the possibility of an omnipotent deceiver to reject the external world, the information given to him from his senses, mathematics and logic, Descartes discovered at least one thing could be known apodictically. If he himself was doubting, then he had to exist. Thus Cogito Ergo Sum - I think, therefore I am - became the first principle of Cartesianism.

Descartes then claimed that because he discovered the Cogito through perceiving it clearly and distinctly, anything he can perceive clearly and distinctly must be true. Then he argues that he can conceive of an infinite being, but finite beings cannot produce infinite ideas and hence an infinite being must have put the idea into his mind. He uses this argument, commonly known as an ontological argument, to invoke the existence of an omni-benevolent God as the indubitable foundation that makes all sciences possible. Many people admired Descartes intentions, but were unsatisfied with this solution. Some accused him of circularity, proclaiming his ontological argument uses his definition of truth as a premise, while his proof of his definition of truth uses his ontological argument as a premise. Hence the problems of solipsism, truth and the existence of the external world came to dominate 17th century western thought.

Another famous problem arises from Descartes’ substance dualism. For Descartes, a substance is that which can be conceived independent of everything else and exist independent of anything else. Since Descartes conceived of the mind independent of everything else when doubting everything uncertain, and because if he wanted to God could produce a world in which only the mind existed, he came to define the mind as a different substance from that of body. For Descartes, the mind is defined as an unextended substance and the body as an extended substance. This raised the fundamental question of how it is possible that mind and body interact with one another.

Nicolas Malebranche 

One solution to the mind–body problem came from Cartesian Nicolas Malebranche (1638–1715). Malebranche maintained that created substances of a different kind cannot interact with one another. In fact, he believed substances of the same kind could not interact either because no necessary causation could be perceived. He proposes then that it is God, an uncreated substance, who brings it about that each time one perceives a 'cause', one also perceives an 'effect'. Hence the doctrine is named occasionalism.

Malebranche was well-known and celebrated in his own time, but has since become somewhat of an obscure figure in the history of western philosophy. His philosophy had a profound effect on it, however, through its influence upon Spinoza and Hume, whose problem of causation was influenced by Malebranche’s occasionalism. It’s possible that Malebranche also influenced George Berkeley, although he rejects any association with Malebranche beyond superficial similarities.

18th century 

French philosophy in the 18th century was deeply political. It was heavily imbued with Enlightenment principles and many of its philosophers became critics of church and state and promoters of rationality and progress. These philosophers would come to have a deep influence on the politics and ideologies of France and America.

Charles de Secondat, baron de Montesquieu (1689–1755) was a social commentator and political philosopher. His theories deeply influenced the American Founders. His belief that the state powers be separated into legislative, executive, and judicial branches formed the basis for separation of powers under the United States Constitution. In The Spirit of the Laws, Montesquieu outlined the view that man and societies are influenced by climate. He believed that hotter climates create hot-tempered people and colder climates aloof people, whereas the mild climate of France is ideal for political systems. This theory may possibly have been influenced by similar sentiment expressed in Germania, an ethnographic writing by Tacitus, a writer frequently studied by Montesquieu.

Voltaire (1694–1778) came to embody the Enlightenment with his criticisms of Church dogma and French institutions, his defence of civil liberties and his support of social reform. The civil liberties for which he fought were those of the right to a free trial and freedom of religion. He is best remembered for his aphorisms and his satire of Leibniz known as Candide, which tells the tale of a young believer in Leibnizian optimism who becomes disillusioned after a series of hardships.

Jean-Jacques Rousseau (1712–1778) distinguished himself from the progressive scientism of the Enlightenment with his proclamation in Discourse on the Arts and Sciences that art and science are corruptors of human morality. Furthermore, he caused controversy with his theory that man is good by nature but corrupted by society, which is a direct contradiction of the Christian doctrine of original sin. Some of his theories continue to be controversial, such as his idea called the general will, which has been both accused of fascism and praised for its socialist ideals. Rousseau’s thought highly influenced the French Revolution, his critique of private property has been seen as a forebear to Marxist ideology, and his picture was the only one to grace the home of Immanuel Kant. He was so highly praised by the French revolutionists, that in 1794 his remains were moved to the Panthéon in Paris.

Denis Diderot (1713–1784) was a key collaborator in the creation of the Encyclopédia. A systematic collection of all the information of the arts and sciences, the Encyclopédia caused great controversy. Diderot was harassed repeatedly by the police, and was even arrested. The ecclesiastical party disliked the Encyclopédia, which was a threat to the aristocracy because it asserted that the state should take care of the people and not itself, religious freedom, freedom of thought and the value of science and industry. In the end, the bookseller began removing all articles he deemed controversial in fear of punishment. The Encyclopédia that Diderot had worked on for twenty years was ruined beyond repair.

19th century

Auguste Comte 

Auguste Comte (1798–1857) was a philosopher born in Montpellier. He was the founder of the discipline of sociology and the doctrine of positivism, and may be regarded as the first philosopher of science in the modern sense of the term.

Strongly influenced by the Utopian socialist, Henri de Saint-Simon, Comte developed the positive philosophy in an attempt to remedy the social malaise of the French revolution, calling for a new social paradigm based on the sciences. Comte offered an account of social evolution, proposing that society undergoes three phases in its quest for the truth according to a general 'law of three stages'. Comte's stages were (1) the theological, (2) the metaphysical, and (3) the positive.

Comte attempted to introduce a cohesive "religion of humanity" which, though largely unsuccessful, was influential in the development of various Secular Humanist organizations in the 19th century. He also created and defined the term "altruism".

Comte was of considerable influence in 19th century thought, impacting the work of thinkers such as Karl Marx and John Stuart Mill.

Ferdinand de Saussure 

Ferdinand de Saussure (1857–1913) was a Swiss linguist who taught for many years in Paris. He was concerned with distinguishing linguistics from philology by moving from the study of the history of individual words and comparisons of languages to the study of the essential underlying structures of language. His small output of work, most of which was published posthumously, became the foundations of linguistics, semiotics and structuralism, the school of philosophy concerned with the underlying structures which form, limit and affect society, language and the human mind.

Saussure divided language into two parts: the langue, which is the system of signs and rules owned by a community, and parole, the individual acts of speech within the given community. This was likened by Saussure to chess and a game of chess, for before anyone can play, they have to know the rules and structure of the game.

For Saussure, the essential unit of any language is the word, or sign. Like language, he divides the word into two inseparable parts: the signifier, which is the sound image, and the signified, which is the concept associated with the signifier. Saussure stressed the arbitrariness of this association, maintaining that any signifier can refer to any signified. How a sign obtains its meaning is by what it is not within the langue, not what it is. For example, the word ‘dog’ means dog simply because it does not mean cat, bird or cornflakes.

It can already be seen clearly that language is highly dualistic for Saussure. Indeed, he maintained that man thought essentially in dichotomies. For Saussure, the way language can be studied is dualistic too. It can be studied synchronically, i.e. as a complete system within a frozen moment of time, or it can be studied diachronically, which is the examination of its historical development. It can be said that structuralists focussed on the synchronic aspects of culture, while poststructuralists, as a reaction toward the highly dualistic and deterministic characteristics, focussed on the diachronic aspects of culture in an attempt to invoke a grey area.

Henri Bergson 

While Ferdinand de Saussure was a relatively obscure thinker in his time, it may be said that Henri Bergson (1859–1941) was somewhat of a celebrity. His philosophy appealed both to academics and the general public from its first inception in 1889 to Bergson’s death in the early 20th century. Although a major influence on William James, Alfred North Whitehead, Jean-Paul Sartre, Emmanuel Lévinas, Maurice Merleau-Ponty and the novelist Marcel Proust, interest in his work greatly decreased after WW2. However, in the late 20th century, through the works of self-proclaimed Bergsonian Gilles Deleuze came a revitalization of interest in Henri Bergson’s oeuvre.

All of Henri Bergson’s works were concerned with his theory of real time as it is experienced by consciousness. He came by the idea while trying to improve on the evolutionary philosophy of Herbert Spencer, and has likened it to the rolling and unrolling of thread to represent man’s sense of mortality and the continual gain of new memory; a spectrum of a thousand shades with a current of feeling running through them, collecting and retaining them, to represent how all the moments are heterogeneous; and a piece of elastic contracted to a point and then drawn out indefinitely, producing a line which will progressively grow longer and longer, to represent pure, indivisible mobility. However, these images are insufficient and can only show the idea indirectly. The first is too homogeneous, the second is juxtaposed and complete whereas time is in a constant state of becoming, and the third forgets the heterogeneous nature of the idea. In fact, Bergson maintains that the case is the same for any other image of the idea one can produce.

Bergson calls this idea Duration and defines it as being qualitative, not quantitative, unextended, not extended, a multiplicity yet a unity, mobile and continuously interpenetrating itself. However, it should be warned that Bergson believes Duration cannot be represented by concepts either. Bergson calls the creation of concepts analysis and believes it can never represent the absolute. He likens it to constructing a model of a city out of a collection of photographs taken from every angle and a poem being translated and having commentary piled upon commentary: the model of the city can never replicate the feeling of being in the city itself and the translation and commentaries can never give the simple dimensional value of walking in the city itself. Indeed, symbols always distort the part of an object they represent through generalization to include it and every other objects’ part they represent.

The Duration can only be grasped through intuition, the sympathy by which one is transported into an object to grasp what is unique and ineffable within it. Intuition is a complete philosophical method that involves placing oneself within the Duration, and expanding it into a continuous heterogeneity, differentiating the extremities within it to create a dualism, before showing them to in fact be one. An example of this is Duration itself, which is neither a multiplicity or a unity. But depending on which point of view one recreates it from, one will either reconstruct it as a unity or a multiplicity. Hence substance pluralism and substance monism are in fact two representations of the same phenomenon.

Henri Bergson was awarded the Nobel Prize for Literature in 1927 "in recognition of his rich and vitalizing ideas and the brilliant skill with which they have been presented".

20th century 

French philosophy in the 20th century saw the rise of many schools of thought. The philosophy of science with Poincaré, Bachelard, Cavaillès and Vuillemin. The phenomenology, presented in a Cartesian format and influenced by German thought, particularly the phenomenology of Husserl and Heidegger. Phenomenology was consistently noticeable throughout the 20th century, whereas existentialism spread throughout the west and gained fame, only to die out somewhat with the advent of structuralism, which came to be seen as merely a necessary means of access to post-structuralism, while postmodern thought came to dominate the late 20th century.

Philosophy of science 

Philosophy of science is a branch of philosophy concerned with the foundations, methods, and implications of science. The central questions of this study concern what qualifies as science, the reliability of scientific theories, and the ultimate purpose of science. In France, philosophy of science, also known as French historical epistemology or French epistemology, was a prominent school of thought with Henri Poincaré, Émile Meyerson, Pierre Duhem, Léon Brunschvicg, Gaston Bachelard, Alexandre Koyré, Jean Cavaillès, Georges Canguilhem, Jules Vuillemin, Michel Serres, and Jean-Michel Berthelot.

Henri Poincaré (1854–1912) had philosophical views opposite to those of Bertrand Russell and Gottlob Frege, who believed that mathematics was a branch of logic. Poincaré strongly disagreed, claiming that intuition was the life of mathematics; he gives an interesting point of view in his book Science and Hypothesis.

Pierre Duhem (1861–1916) introduced the Duhem thesis, an early form of confirmation holism.

Gaston Bachelard (1884–1962) introduced the concepts of epistemological obstacle and epistemological break (obstacle épistémologique and rupture épistémologique).

Jean Cavaillès (1903–1944) was specialized in philosophy of science concerned with the axiomatic method, formalism, set theory and mathematical logic.

Jules Vuillemin (1920–2001) introduced the concept of the philosophy of algebra and was specialized in philosophy of knowledge.

Phenomenology 

Phenomenology can be defined as a way of philosophizing which involves descriptive explanations of phenomena as it is given to consciousness and how it is given to consciousness, which attempts to avoid imposed explanations. In France, phenomenology was seen as a radical Cartesianism which rejected substance dualism to better understand transcendental consciousness. It played a major role in existentialism and many postmodern philosophers' thought, such as Gilles Deleuze and Jacques Derrida, who actually began his career with a deep, critical study of Edmund Husserl. Phenomenology is still an important area of research in France today.

Emmanuel Lévinas (1906–1995) was one of the first to introduce phenomenology to France, through his translation of Edmund Husserl’s Cartesian Meditations. Lévinas considered ethics primary in philosophy and once proclaimed that it precedes metaphysics and should be considered the first philosophy. He developed a moral philosophy based around notions of the other and the face which introduced ethics into phenomenology, which had been missing since the demise of Max Scheler.

Maurice Merleau-Ponty (1908–1961) was concerned with the foundations of perception. His theory of the subject-body was produced as an alternative to René Descartes' Cogito and substance dualism. In contrast to the clear distinction between the mind and the external world, where the latter is but an extension of the former, the subject-body is an existential account of the pre-reflective subject, the subject's perception and the world as intricately intertwined.

Paul Ricœur (1913–2005) was one of the first to introduce phenomenology to France. He was best known for combining phenomenological description with hermeneutics. He was awarded the Kyoto prize in arts and philosophy for having "revolutionized the methods of hermeneutic phenomenology, expanding the study of textual interpretation to include the broad yet concrete domains of mythology, biblical exegesis, psychoanalysis, theory of metaphor, and narrative theory.

Existentialism 

Existentialism was a prominent school of thought in the first half of the 20th century. Traditionally, existentialism is concerned with the human condition, exploring such topics as purpose, freedom and the experience of the other. It can trace its roots back to philosophers such as Søren Kierkegaard, Friedrich Nietzsche and Martin Heidegger, as well as Lebensphilosophie, but bloomed with the thought of French phenomenologist Jean-Paul Sartre.

Jean-Paul Sartre (1905–1980) defined his existentialism as drawing all the conclusions from a consistent line of atheism. His major thesis is that existence precedes essence. With an immaterial object, such as a knife, an artisan devises an essence, such as that of slicing bread, and then produces an object whose purpose it is to fulfil its essence. However, without God, there is no artisan who developed the essence of man in a teleological sense. So first man is born free, thrown into the world where sole responsibility for his actions rests on his shoulders, then through his actions he defines the essence of not only himself, but of what he believes man ought to be. The denial of this responsibility through excuses is what Sartre termed bad faith. Jean-Paul Sartre was a spokesman for a generation, but his influence waned with the advent of structuralism.

Albert Camus (1913–1960) rejected being labelled an existentialist, preferring to be called an absurdist. In the opening pages of The Myth of Sisyphus, he states what he considers to be the fundamental question of philosophy: is suicide the correct response to an absurd world? Likening a Godless life to the story of Sisyphus, where he is doomed forever to push a rock up a hill only for it to roll down again, Camus’ answer is "No. It requires revolt. […] The struggle itself is enough to fill a man’s heart. One must imagine Sisyphus happy."

Simone de Beauvoir (1908–1986) was an existential feminist. Beauvoir believed that through surrounding women in a false aura of mystery, man had turned her into "the other". Furthermore, she proclaimed women were stereotyped by this aura and that it was used by man as an excuse for not understanding them and dominating them. "The other" is always the underclass. But Beauvoir maintains that Sartre’s thesis (that is, existence precedes essence) applies to women as much as it does to men and that through their choices and actions, women can transcend this aura and reject being the underclass.

Moral and Political Philosophy 
Simone Weil (1909–1943) was a French philosopher, mystic and political activist who greatly influenced 20th century philosophy including influencing Pope Paul VI. Her notable ideas include decreation (renouncing the gift of free will as a form of acceptance of everything that is independent of one's particular desires; making "something created pass into the uncreated"), uprootedness (déracinement), patriotism of compassion, abolition of political parties, the unjust character of affliction (malheur), and that compassion must act in the area of metaxy.

Structuralism 

As previously mentioned, French Structuralism is primarily concerned with the underlying structures which form, limit and affect society, language and the human mind. It finds its roots in the thought of Ferdinand de Saussure, who was concerned with linguistics. But soon structuralism began to be applied to anthropology, social sciences and psychology. Structuralism played a major role in intellectual thought after World War Two, where it rejected existential concepts of freedom for the idea of man as determined by structures in the thought of such thinkers as Claude Lévi-Strauss and Jacques Lacan. However, by the end of the century it became perceived as important not for itself, but for the schools of thought it produced, such as poststructuralism and deconstruction.

Claude Lévi-Strauss (1908–2009) applied Saussure’s structuralism to anthropology, specifically in the topic of intermarriage between tribes.

Roland Barthes (1915–1980) was a literary critic and semiologist who applied Saussure’s thought to literary theory. In Mythologies, Barthes explored articles, advertisements, movies, etc. to demonstrate the deep-seated bourgeois propaganda found within. He described these myths as second-order signs. A certain form of green bottles signify red wine. The bourgeois then  assign a second signifier to this signifier, that of relaxing, healthy, strong wine, be it to sell products or uphold the status quo.

Jacques Lacan (1901–1981) was a psychoanalyst who sought to explain the mind in terms of structures both in order to correct perceived errors in Freud’s thought as well as errors in the subsequent interpretation of Freud through the theories of Saussure, Strauss and Barthes. Lacan was also influenced by German philosophers G. W. F. Hegel and Martin Heidegger through Alexandre Kojève's lectures on Hegel's Phenomenology of Spirit.

Louis Althusser (1918–1990) and his colleagues, prominently including Étienne Balibar, reworked Marxism using insights from structuralism, against the so-called "humanist" trend in Sartrean and Western Marxisms. Althusser offered an influential new reading of Marx's work, describing an "epistemological break" between the young, Hegelian Marx and the late Marx of Das Kapital.  With his focus on the economic level and theory, Althusser came into conflict with social historians, such as E. P. Thompson.

Poststructuralism and postmodernism

The second half of the 20th century saw the rise of so-called postmodern thought. This rise was especially noticeable in France. However, the term is fairly hard to define. In fact, some people maintain that it is nothing but a slur applied to a group of disparate philosophers wrongly grouped together. However, it can also be seen as a critique of traditional western thought, particularly dichotomies and the belief in progress, influenced heavily by structuralism, phenomenology and existentialism.

Jean-François Lyotard (1924–1998) defined postmodernism as scepticism toward metanarratives. A metanarrative is a kind of grand arching story that encompasses - and claims to predict - everything. An example is Marxism, which explains the communist as the inevitable historical synthesis of the proletariat and capitalist of modern capitalist class division. Lyotard considered the metanarrative an essential feature of modernity. Hence the postmodern condition is the replacement of metanarratives with a multiplicity of micro-narratives, or to call them the appellation Lyotard gave them, language games. Lyotard maintained that these language games lack any all-embracing structure but were brought about by technological developments in such fields as communication and mass media making metanarratives indefensible.

Michel Foucault (1926–1984) maintained a similar scepticism about absolutes, such as right and wrong, sane and insane, and human nature. His method was not to deny such notions, but to historicize them, examining what in the supposedly necessary may be contingent, and demonstrating the relationships between knowledge and politics, power and knowledge. His main fields of investigation were psychiatry, medicine and disciplinary institutions. Foucault was anti-Hegelian and anti-teleological in his historical excavations. Through his examinations of psychiatry in Madness and Civilization, he showed that the development of psychiatry was not an obvious improvement on previous treatments of the insane, and that furthermore, the apparent scientific neutrality of psychiatric treatments hides the fact that they are a form of controlling defiance of bourgeois society.

Jacques Derrida (1930–2004) developed deconstruction as a response to structuralism. Deconstruction takes a text, examines binary oppositions within it from several different interpreting standpoints, and then attempts to show them to be dependent upon one another, unstable, ambiguous and historically and culturally defined. Through showing the fluidity of the dichotomies, deconstruction shows the fluidity of the text. Derrida maintained that no meaning is stable, not even the dichotomies classical philosophers took for granted. Through an internal logic, the text deconstructs itself and hence allows highly original interpretations.

Jean Baudrillard (1929–2007)  was concerned with the concealment of the fact that there are no truths in a given field. He termed this concealment simulacra. An example he gives is the Borges story of an Empire that creates a map which was so accurate that it laid over and covered the entire city it mapped. The map grew when the Empire grew, and decayed when the empire decayed. When the empire was destroyed, the only object left was the map. For Baudrillard, people live in the map and hence reality crumbles because of misuse. Eventually, the difference between reality and illusion becomes indistinguishable for the consciousness. Baudrillard called this hyperreality. An example of this is reality television, which is dependent on the watcher embracing it to create the illusion that it mirrors reality.

Gilles Deleuze (1925–1995) developed a philosophy of difference which valued the simulacrum higher than the idea and its copy, which is an inversion of Plato’s method, which held the idea and its copy in high esteem and neglected the simulacrum. He saw difference as prior to identity and reason as not all-encompassing, but a little haven built in the duration of difference-in-itself. He likened it to Christianity, where if you accept original sin and immaculate conception, then it all makes sense. Deleuze also developed a constructivist view of philosophy as the job of developing concepts, just like it is the poet’s job to produce poems and the painter’s job to paint paintings. For these reasons, Deleuze developed an idiosyncratic way of reading philosophers which he once referred to as buggery. He would use them as stepping stones for creating new concepts which appear to belong to the philosopher he’s reading, but are utterly different. An example is that of Spinoza, whom Deleuze read as an empiricist.

Hélène Cixous (born 1937) developed a feminist interpretation of post-structuralism most influenced by Derrida. She argued that patriarchal cultures build male domination into their language and literary canon, and that a feminist revolution must account for this. She urged female writers to adopt deconstructionist methods and forward their own vision of life as a woman.

See also 
List of French philosophers
Non-philosophy
Speculative realism

References

External links
The Journal of French and Francophone Philosophy – the online home of the Bulletin de la Société Américaine de Philosophie de Langue Française

 
Continental philosophy
Philosophy
French literature